Morgans Hotel is a hotel in Swansea, Wales. Describing itself as Swansea's only boutique hotel, the four-star hotel occupies a Grade II listed building in the heart of the city.

The hotel is steeped in maritime history and the building was formerly used by the Associated British Ports. The hotel has 42 rooms, 20 in the main building and 22 in the Regency-style townhouse next door.

Originally completed in 1903 for the Swansea Harbour Trust, the main hotel building was designed by architect Edwin Seward who submitted the winning design out of 100 entries. The original character of the building is still preserved after its conversion to a hotel. The decorative Baroque exterior is clad in red brick and white stone and topped by a Greek statue-clad clock cupola. The interior features stained glass with compasses, exploration and maritime themes. A mural by Cardiff-born artist Robert Morton Nance (1873–1959) depicting tall masted ships on the River Tawe, overlooked by Swansea Castle, decorates the boardroom .

Previous names for the building have included "The Swansea Harbour Trust Office", The British Transport Docks Board Office" and " The Associated British Ports Office", reflecting the names of the building's occupiers.

References

External links
BBC South West Wales: From Harbour to Hotel... (history of building)
Morgans Hotel website

Edwin Seward buildings
Grade II* listed buildings in Swansea
Hotel buildings completed in 1903
Hotels in Wales